The 1990 House elections in Georgia occurred on November 3, 1990 to elect the members of the State of Georgia's delegation to the United States House of Representatives. Georgia had ten seats in the House, apportioned according to the 1980 United States Census. These elections were held concurrently with the United States Senate elections of 1990 (including one election in Georgia), the United States House elections in other states, and various state and local elections.

Overview

Results

References

1990
Georgia
1990 Georgia (U.S. state) elections